Sydney Cove is a bay on the southern shore of Sydney Harbour, one of several harbours in Port Jackson, on the coast of Sydney, New South Wales. Sydney Cove is a focal point for community celebrations, due to its central Sydney location between the Sydney Opera House and the Sydney Harbour Bridge.

History 

The Eora name for Sydney Cove was recorded by several early settlers of the First Fleet variously spelt as Warrane, War-ran, Warrang and Wee-rong. The spot is of great significance, as the first meeting place between Eora people and Europeans. Before colonisation of the area, Eora men speared fish from the shoreline, and women line-fished from their  (canoes).

Sydney Cove was named after the British Home Secretary, the 1st Baron Sydney (who was later created 1st Viscount Sydney in 1789). It was the site chosen by Captain Arthur Phillip, RN between 21 and 23 January 1788 for the British penal settlement which is now the city of Sydney, and where possession of New South Wales was formally declared on 26 January (now commemorated as Australia Day). Today, the exact site where the flag was planted is unmarked, being a spot near the bottom of Bethel Steps, The Rocks (behind the south end of the present Overseas Passenger Terminal)  This site on the west side of the Cove is confirmed by a 1789 letter by John Campbell.

Phillip had been instructed to establish the settlement at Botany Bay, a large bay further south of Sydney Cove which had been discovered by Lieutenant James Cook during his voyage of discovery in 1770, and was recommended by the eminent botanist Sir Joseph Banks, who had accompanied Cook, as a suitable site for a settlement. But Phillip discovered that Botany Bay offered neither a secure anchorage nor a reliable source of fresh water. Sydney Cove offered both of these, being serviced by a freshwater creek which was soon to be known as the Tank Stream.

Sydney Cove Medallion
A sample of the dark grey clay of Sydney Cove was collected by Governor Phillip and given to Sir Joseph Banks, who gave it to pottery maker Josiah Wedgwood to test for suitability for making pottery. Wedgwood found it excellent and made a commemorative medal that became known as the Sydney Cove Medallion.

Today
The cove is dual-named as Warrane, the name by which it was known by the Eora people.

The Tank Stream is encased in a concrete drain beneath the streets of the central business district and all native bushland has been cleared. The head of the cove is occupied by the Circular Quay ferry terminal. On Bennelong Point at the northern end of the eastern shore of the cove stands the Sydney Opera House. On the western shore is the historic district known as The Rocks.

Sydney Cove is a focal point for community celebrations, due to its central Sydney location between the Sydney Opera House and the Sydney Harbour Bridge. It is also one of the main congregation points for Sydney New Year's Eve and Australia Day events.

See also 
 Culture of Sydney
 Sydney punchbowls

References

Further reading 
 D. Manning Richards. Destiny in Sydney: An epic novel of convicts, Aborigines, and Chinese embroiled in the birth of Sydney, Australia. First book in Sydney series. Washington DC: Aries Books, 2012.

External links 

 Geographic coordinates: 

Australian penal colonies
Defunct prisons in Sydney
Sydney Harbour
History of immigration to Australia
Tourist attractions in Sydney